The 2018 Women's Youth World Handball Championship was the seventh edition of the tournament and took place in Kielce, Poland from 7 to 19 August 2018.

Russia defeated Hungary in the final to win their second straight and third overall title.

Qualification

Brazil was unable to participate and therefore Austria was being named to replace them.

Venues
The championship will be played at two venues in Kielce. All the venue capacities are the capacity for handball events.

Draw
The draw was held on 26 April 2018 in Basel, Switzerland.

Seeding

Preliminary round
All time are local (UTC+2).

Group A

Group B

Group C

Group D

President's Cup

21st place bracket

21st–24th place semifinals

23rd place game

21st place game

17th place bracket

17th–20th place semifinals

19th place game

17th place game

9–16th placement games
The eight losers of the round of 16 will be seeded according to their results in the preliminary round against teams ranked 1–4.

Ranking

15th place game

13th place game

Eleventh place game

Ninth place game

Knockout stage

Bracket

5th place bracket

Round of 16

Quarterfinals

5–8th place semifinals

Semifinals

Seventh place game

Fifth place game

Third place game

Final

Final ranking

Awards
 MVP :  Elena Mikhaylichenko
 Top Goalscorer :  Nikita van der Vliet (64 goals)

All-Star Team
 Goalkeeper :  Anna Vereshchak
 Right wing :  Kíra Bánfai
 Right back :  Park So-youn
 Centre back :  Valeriia Kirdiasheva
 Left back :  Isabelle Andersson
 Left wing :  Yun Ye-jin
 Pivot :  Nikita van der Vliet

References

External links
Official website
IHF website

2018 Women's Youth World Handball Championship
International handball competitions hosted by Poland
2018
Women's Youth World Handball Championship
Women's handball in Poland
Youth World Handball Championship
Han